The Birmingham and Fazeley Canal is a canal of the Birmingham Canal Navigations in the West Midlands of England. Its purpose was to provide a link between the Coventry Canal and Birmingham and thereby connect Birmingham to London via the Oxford Canal.

History
The story of the Birmingham and Fazeley begins in 1770, when the Birmingham Canal Company was seen as having a monopoly. At the time, the coalfields at Walsall did not have canal access, and a public meeting was held at Lichfield on 18 August to discuss an independent link from Walsall to Fradley Junction on the Trent and Mersey Canal, passing through Lichfield. Opposition from local landowners resulted in the plan being shelved, but a further plan was proposed at a meeting held in Warwick in August 1781, for a canal to run from Wednesbury through Fazeley to Atherstone, which was the end of the Coventry Canal at the time. The plans were changed somewhat in October, but shareholders in the Birmingham Canal saw it as a serious threat.

Two bills were put before Parliament in 1782, one for the Birmingham and Fazeley, and a rival one from the Birmingham Canal for a branch from Wednesbury to Walsall. Both sides opposed the other's proposal, and both bills were defeated.
The promoters then opened negotiations with other canal companies, to ensure that when the canal was built, it would be part of a larger network. In 1782, they obtained an agreement from the Oxford Canal Company that they would complete the route to the River Thames at Oxford, one from the Coventry Canal that they would extend their canal from Atherstone to Fazeley, and agreed that they would complete the Coventry Canal's route from Fazeley as far as Whittington, as the Coventry Canal company could not finance the whole route. The Trent and Mersey would finish that link by building the remainder of the route to Fradley Junction. A second bill was put before Parliament, and at the same time, the Birmingham Canal presented a scheme for a canal from Riders Green to Broadwaters, near Walsall, with eight branches, and a second canal from Newhall to Fazeley. The Birmingham and Fazeley was authorised by an Act of Parliament obtained in 1784. The new company and the Birmingham Canal merged soon afterwards, becoming the awkwardly named Birmingham & Birmingham & Fazeley Canal Company.

John Smeaton was the engineer employed by the Birmingham and Fazeley, but work did not start immediately, as he was also responsible for the Riders Green to Broadwaters line, which was completed first. The project did not go smoothly, as there were disputes between James Bough, the superintendent of the canal company, and Pinkertons, who were the civil engineering contractors employed to carry out the work. The issue concerned the cement that the Pinkertons were using. Work on the Fazeley line began in April 1786, with Bough still acting as superintendent, and the Pinkertons responsible for the construction of the section between Minworth and Fazeley. In late 1786, George Pinkerton found out that the levels, which had been surveyed by Bough, were wrong. Samuel Bull, the engineer for the canal company, investigated and reported that Pinkerton was right. The Pinkertons started to work on the project from January 1787, even though the contracts were not signed until May. Bough made a series of allegations that Pinkertons' workmanship and the materials used were of poor quality.

The company stopped paying Pinkerton in late 1788, as the costs were exceeding the original estimates, and the contract was taken away from them in February 1789. There was then a financial dispute over money which had been paid to Pinkerton as "extras", but which the company then claimed were overpayments. Some £2,750 was at issue, and the case rumbled on for a decade, until a court case in 1801 gave him only £436 of the claim. Unhappy with the outcome, Pinkerton justified his position, but his remarks about John Houghton, the Company Clerk, were deemed to be libellous, for which he was fined and spent some time in prison.

The canal was completed in August 1789. The benefits of the co-operation with the other canal companies were that when all the links were completed in 1790, it immediately generated a great deal of freight traffic. This created problems, as the flights of locks at Aston and Farmer's Bridge became congested, and this became worse when the Warwick Canal built a junction onto the Digbeth Branch. The problem was not solved until 1844, when the Birmingham and Warwick Junction Canal to the south east and the Tame Valley Canal to the north west were opened. The name of the Birmingham & Birmingham & Fazeley Canal Company was changed to Birmingham Canal Navigations in 1794.

In 2019, the Canal & River Trust announced that repair works had started on two locks at Farmer's Bridge Locks as part of a wider £2.5 million programme of repairs across the West Midlands.

In 2022, work started on the "Scotland Works" site opposite Lock 1 of Farmer's Bridge Locks, a former glassworks that is being redeveloped into residential apartments named Lockside Wharf by Consortia Developments and Joseph Mews Property Group. Lockside Wharf will comprise 61 apartments and is currently under construction.

Route

The canal is now regarded as running from the BCN Main Line at Old Turn Junction (near the National Indoor Arena), Birmingham to the Coventry Canal at Fazeley Junction, just outside Tamworth. The length of this stretch is 15 miles (24 km), and it includes 38 locks. There is a one-mile (1.6 km) branch called the Digbeth Branch Canal which runs from the junction to Typhoo Basin and contains 6 locks. A short cut runs from near the end of the branch to the Grand Union Canal at Bordesley Junction.

Below the junction there are another 11 locks, which form the Aston flight. Holborn Hill bridge carries the railway to Aston station over the canal, just before the bottom lock of the flight is reached. At Salford Junction, the Tame Valley Canal runs to the north west, and the Grand Union Canal runs southwards, while the Fazeley heads eastwards. Two more locks continue the descent at Minworth, and the character of the surroundings changes from an urban and industrial landscape to open countryside. There is a short  tunnel at Curdworth, after which fields and flooded gravel pits line the canal. At Drayton Bassett, an eccentric footbridge with Gothic-style towers crosses the canal, close to Drayton Manor Theme Park, after which Fazeley is reached, where the canal joins the Coventry Canal.

The  stretch which extends northwards beyond Fazeley Junction to Whittington, near Lichfield, was built by the Birmingham and Fazeley Canal Company, with the remainder of the route to Fradley Junction being built by the Trent and Mersey Canal. Both sections used the route authorised by the Coventry Canal's Act of Parliament, but although the Coventry Canal subsequently bought back the northern section from the Trent and Mersey Canal, the southern section remained in the ownership of the Birmingham and Fazeley Canal. However, it is often regarded as being part of the Coventry Canal, with the Canal and River Trust quoting the length of that canal as being  which includes the Birmingham and Fazeley section.

Historically the canal started at Farmer's Bridge Top Lock (the real Farmer's Bridge Junction), where it met the already existing Birmingham Canal Newhall Branch. That branch has now been built over, with only Cambrian Wharf surviving.

The Birmingham and Fazeley Canal forms part of the Warwickshire ring.

Features

At Common lock 10, on the lower lock tail, an inscription can be found in the stonework. It reads: "Pax Missa Per Orbem, Pax Quaeritur Bello", which translates as "Peace Is Sent Throughout The World, Peace Is Sought Through War". The inscription comes from two coins, the first part from the Queen Ann Farthing, and the second part from the Cromwell Broad.

Gallery

See also

Canals of the United Kingdom
Transport in Birmingham
History of the British canal system
Waterscape

Bibliography

References

External links

  

Transport in Birmingham, West Midlands
Canals in Staffordshire
Canals in the West Midlands (county)
Tourist attractions in Birmingham, West Midlands
Birmingham Canal Navigations
Kingsbury, Warwickshire
Canals opened in 1789
1789 establishments in England